Friedrich Philipp Immanuel Niethammer (6 March 1766 – 1 April 1848), later Ritter von Niethammer, was a German theologian, philosopher and Lutheran educational reformer.

Biography
He received instruction at the Maulbronn monastery, and in 1784 became a student at Tübinger Stift, where he met Friedrich Hölderlin (1770–1843), Georg Wilhelm Friedrich Hegel (1770–1831) and Friedrich Wilhelm Joseph Schelling (1775–1854). In 1790 he moved to Jena, where he studied Kantian philosophy under Karl Leonhard Reinhold (1757–1823). Subsequently, he became an associate professor of philosophy at the University of Jena, where he remained until 1804. In 1806, he was Protestant Oberschulkommissar (upper school administrator) of Franconia, and the next year, he became Central Commissioner of Education and a member of the Protestant General Consistory of Bavaria.

In 1797, with Johann Gottlieb Fichte (1762–1814), Niethammer was co-editor of  the Philosophische Journal. In 1798, the journal published  Friedrich Karl Forberg's Entwicklung des Begriffs der Religion ("Development of the Concept of Religion"), an essay that Fichte prefaced with Über den Grund unsers Glaubens an eine göttliche Weltregierung ("Grounds of Our Belief in a Divine Government of the Universe"). Reaction to the article included accusations of atheism, sparking the so-called 1798–99 Atheismusstreit (atheism dispute), an event that eventually led to Fichte's 1799 departure from Jena.

In 1808, Niethammer published Der Streit des Philanthropinismus und des Humanismus in der Theorie des Erziehungs-Unterrichts unsrer Zeit ("The Dispute between Philanthropinism and Humanism in the Educational Theory of our Time"), a book that was a reaction to philanthropinism, an educational concept that was developed during the Age of Enlightenment. Philanthropinism valued practical and physical education and largely rejected rote-learning of the classics. Niethammer agreed with the philanthropinists in that a measure of autonomy was important in education, but he found their teaching philosophy too extreme. He believed that a sense of civics and civility were vital in a child's education, and made efforts to combine the best of philanthropinism with the best of "humanism", a word that he derived from Cicero's "humanitas".

Selected works 
 Ueber den Versuch einer Kritik aller Offenbarung; eine philosophische Abhandlung, 1792.
 Über Religion als Wissenschaft zur Bestimmung des Inhalts der Religionen und der Behandlungsart ihrer Urkunden, 1795
 Der Herausgeber des Philosophischen Journals gerichtliche Verantwortungsschriften : gegen die Anklage des Atheismus, (1799, Fichte's reply to the charge of atheism).
 Der Streit des Philanthropinismus und Humanismus in der Theorie des Erziehungs-Unterrichts unsrer Zeit, 1808.

References 
 "Parts of this article are based on a translation of an equivalent article at the German Wikipedia".

External links
 The Humanist Magazine, 200 years of Humanism
 Essay on Atheismusstreit

1766 births
1848 deaths
19th-century educational theorists
German educational theorists
German Lutherans
German male non-fiction writers
German philosophers
German theologians
Lutheran philosophers
People from the Duchy of Württemberg
Academic staff of the University of Jena